The Newport Pop Festival, held in Costa Mesa, California, on August 3–4, 1968, was the first music concert ever to have more than 100,000 paid attendees. Its sequel, billed as Newport 69, was held in Northridge, California, on June 20–22, 1969, and had a total attendance estimated at 200,000.

History
There were two separate events staged in the late 1960s that are commonly referred to as the "Newport Pop Festival." The first was called the Newport Pop Festival — no relation to the folk or jazz festivals in Rhode Island — was as held at the Orange County Fairgrounds in Costa Mesa, California, on the weekend of August 3–4, 1968. The second event was originally billed as "Newport 69," and was held over the three-day weekend of June 20–22, 1969 in Northridge, California, at Devonshire Downs. In published writings over the last 40 years, this latter event has been referred to as the "Newport 69 Pop Festival," the "Newport Pop Festival 1969" or simply the "Newport Pop Festival." Subsequently, much confusion has been created over the years between the 1968 and 1969 events. Some of this confusion was generated by the participating musicians themselves who, in later interviews, often mixed up the two events.

The latter event was organized by Mark Robinson (age 25), who was one of the three promoters of the original Newport Pop Festival in 1968.  The other two promoters of the '68 event were Gary R. Schmidt (age 26) and his father Al Schmidt. Al was not a rock 'n' roller, but rather an entrepreneurial businessman who helped with the money and licensing. There was a brief lawsuit between the two Schmidts and Robinson just prior to the "Newport 69" show, which the Schmidts had declined to be involved in because of the cost of the acts. Robinson reportedly spent  $282,000 for the acts. The entire band budget for the '68 show was under $50,000, while Robinson paid Jimi Hendrix alone $100,000 for the '69 event. This was an amount of money unheard of at that time for a rock act.  The lawsuit was over trade names and, within the last few days before the '69 show, the court ordered that Robinson had to use "not affiliated with the Newport Pop Festival" disclaimers in advertising. Otherwise, he would not have been able to stage a "Newport 70" show using that name.  A round flyer with the dimensions of a 45RPM record was used to promote the 1968 Costa Mesa show and is included in "The Art of Rock," a publication of 1960s and 1970s poster art.  This flyer has sold on eBay for as much as $500.

The Newport Pop Festival 1968
The first Newport Pop Festival was held at the Orange County Fairgrounds in Costa Mesa, California, on the weekend of August 3–4, 1968. It is believed to have been the first pop music concert with over 100,000 paid attendees.

The 1968 event was originally scheduled to be held inside the Orange County Fairgrounds in an outdoor pavilion.  The fairgrounds are on Newport Boulevard, just a short distance from Newport Beach (hence the name). The 1968 event's advance ticket sales were triple of what was expected, and it became evident that no area inside the fairgrounds could hold even 25,000 people, let alone the near 100,000 now predicted.  In the last three days before the show, it was moved to one of the adjoining parking lots of the fairgrounds. Fencing, staging, sanitation, and food concessions had to be organized within just three days. Fencing in some areas consisted of wire blankets and/or tarps thrown over as a visual block. People without tickets on the outside would "storm the fence" and got in for free. None of the commercial concessionaires were prepared for the event, and they all ran out of food and drink halfway through the first day. Water was provided throughout the event by garden hoses from inside the fairgrounds, but attendees had to provide their own containers and give up their viewing spot to reach the water. A broken water supply pipe provided a mud bath that a number of people jumped in, but people realized that the sun would bake the mud into a hard cover, so they stopped. There were plenty of porta-potties available at the rear of the hastily assembled "grounds." There was no shade in the primary viewing area, and partiers were sunburned. The weather was a typical August day in sunny Southern California. Those without hotel reservations had no place to stay. However, city officials alleviated some of the problems by designating a  area of the fairgrounds as an emergency campsite. They also brought in portable toilets and water tanks. This particular event launched some of the problems rock festival promoters would face in the future.

Harvey "Humble Harve" Miller, a Top 40 disc jockey for 93 KHJ-AM in Los Angeles, was hired to promote the show and hosted the event with Wavy Gravy. Wesco Productions (West Coast Productions) consisted of Mark Robinson, Gary Schmidt and Al Schmidt, though Humble Harv was used in advertising for promotional purposes. Tom Neito of Scenic Sounds Productions also assisted in securing the fairgrounds, and was paid a fee and received some promotional billing.  Robinson had been involved with Bob Blodget in staging a much smaller but similar weekend festival in 1967 in Los Angeles. There never was a second edition of this event and its prominence faded from memory until, on August 4, 2008, Jeff Overley penned a feature article for the Orange County Register  that commemorated the event's 40th anniversary.

The big hits with the crowd included Tiny Tim, Jefferson Airplane, Country Joe McDonald, The Chambers Brothers, and Steppenwolf.

Mark Robinson went on to promote a similar "Newport 69" show with Jimi Hendrix and later became an attorney, practicing law with Melvin Belli. Al and Gary teamed up with Bill Quarry, Alfie Zaner and Rich Romello and produced the San Francisco International Pop Festival at the Alameda County Fairgrounds in Pleasanton on October 25–26, 1968. That show drew over 40,000 people and featured Creedence Clearwater Revival, the Chambers Brothers, José Feliciano, Deep Purple, Procol Harum, Johnny Rivers, Iron Butterfly, Eric Burdon and the Animals, Canned Heat, The Grass Roots, Rejoice, and Fraternity of Man. After the show, Al Schmidt continued in non rock 'n' roll business until he died at 83 in the late 1990s. Gary Schmidt entered the nightclub business and continued to promote smaller events throughout Northern California, including two more festivals with attendance in the 25,000–30,000 range: The Labor Day Weekend Music and Arts Festival in Carson City, Nevada in 1972 and Super Sun Bust Summer of 1973 at the Eugene Speedway (Oregon). For some of these productions, Schmidt teamed up with Bill Quarry, a well known early East Bay promoter (see "Teens N Twenties" and "The East Bay Scene, Garage Bands from the '60s, Then and Now"). Schmidt also operated a well-known rock nightclub, the Odyssey Room, in Sunnyvale, California, from 1969 to 1989 (see Odyssey Room Revisited) and a venue just outside Reno, Nevada on Mt. Rose called the Reindeer Lodge which, as of 2010, still hosts occasional shows. Mark Robinson, at the time a Stanford student, promoted a few more concerts and then finished law school. He is now a nationally renowned and accredited attorney, practicing law throughout the United States while keeping a home office in Orange County.

The 1968 event attracted much media attention at the time. Rolling Stone Magazine published an article on the event in its September 14, 1968 edition, writing:

Newport Pop Festival Drags on in Dust and Heat: Dead, Country Joe, Crosby, pie fight weekend's highlights

 Although not listed, Eric Burden introduced a local Long Beach, CA band WAR.

Among other highlights that concert-goers recall were when helicopters flew overhead, dropping flowers on the audience. And on Sunday, Sonny and Cher arrived by helicopter and were later booed off the stage.

Bands performing at the Festival:

Saturday, August 3, 1968

Alice Cooper, Canned Heat, The Chambers Brothers, the Charles Lloyd Quartet, Country Joe and the Fish, The Electric Flag, James Cotton Blues Band, Paul Butterfield Blues Band, Sonny & Cher Blue Cheer Steppenwolf, Tiny Tim Illinois Speed Press, Iron Butterfly.

During the Charles Lloyd Quartet set, a local group called Super Chief began playing a Lee Michaels song, "Hello," on an alternate stage at the rear of the crowd. Most of the attendees turned around and watched them, as the Lloyd music was not in a popular style.

Sunday, August 4, 1968

Eric Burdon & the Animals, Grateful Dead, Jefferson Airplane, Quicksilver Messenger Service,Country Joe & the Fish The Byrds, Things to Come.

Bands that were rumored to have performed at the festival, but didn't

Lovin' Spoonful, Rhinoceros, Sky Pilot and The Turtles were not listed on the official poster for the event.  There is published evidence indicating these bands may have played at the festival, but it was produced by people who never attended the festival and is 100% false.

The 1969 festival was intended to be the successor to the Orange County event, hoping to capitalize on the brand name and market momentum generated in 1968. A move of venue was necessary because the 1968 event had fallen in disfavor with local community leaders. Three days after the 1968 event, the Costa Mesa City Council vowed to prevent a Newport Pop Festival encore. "To say that we would not like it back here would be the understatement of the year," said Costa Mesa Mayor Alvin Pinkley.

The "Newport 69" Festival

Attended by an estimated 200,000 fans on June 20–22, 1969, this festival was the largest pop concert up to that time and is considered the more famous of the two Newport Pop Festivals, possibly because of the appearance of the top-billed Jimi Hendrix Experience. Mark Robinson reportedly spent around $600,000 for the festival, grossed over $750,000, but because of the violence, he claimed to have lost $150,000.

The venue, Devonshire Downs, formerly a racetrack and multi-purpose event and entertainment facility, is now part of the North Campus of California State University at Northridge.

Friday, June 20, 1969

Ike & Tina Turner, Albert King, Edwin Hawkins Singers, The Jimi Hendrix Experience, Joe Cocker, Southwind, Spirit, Don Ellis Orchestra, Taj Mahal, and Jerry Lauderdale.

Saturday, June 21, 1969

Albert Collins, Brenton Wood, Buffy Sainte-Marie, Charity, Creedence Clearwater Revival, Eric Burdon and War, Friends of Distinction, Jethro Tull, Lee Michaels, Love, Steppenwolf and Sweetwater.

Sunday, June 22, 1969

Booker T. & the M.G.'s, The Chambers Brothers, The Flock, The Grass Roots, Johnny Winter, Mother Earth, Jimi Hendrix jam with Buddy Miles, Eric Burdon and Mother Earth, Poco, The Byrds, The Rascals and Three Dog Night. Marvin Gaye's appearance was cancelled because he missed his plane.

Controversy 
Hundreds of people were injured in rioting outside Newport ’69. Due to $50,000 in damages done to neighborhood homes and businesses, an investigation was launched by the Los Angeles police commission. Gatecrashers trespassed the hurricane fencing instead of paying the admission cost ($6 a day in advance, $7 at the gate, $15 in advance for the three days). Outside the festival, teenagers threw bottles and rocks, and damaged property. Some of the kids were as young as 14 getting injured. In total an estimated 300 were injured, 15 of them were police officials and about 75 were arrested. Traffic to and from Devonshire Downs was nearly impassible and parking was limited, so thousands parked in residential neighborhoods. People traveling to the concert on Sunday found no public restrooms open to the public in the area due to trashing done in the previous 2 days. One of the biggest Pop festivals to date, turned into a disaster due to crime and misconduct.

See also
List of historic rock festivals
List of pop festivals
List of music festivals in the United States

Further reading
Epting, Chris (2014). Rock 'n' Roll in Orange County: Music, Madness and Memories. History Press,

Footnotes

External links
Newport Pop poster #1
Newport Pop poster #2
Newport Pop poster #3

Rock festivals in the United States
Counterculture festivals
1968 in American music
1969 in American music
History of Orange County, California
History of Los Angeles County, California
1968 in California
1969 in California
Jam band festivals
Music festivals established in 1968
Pop music festivals in the United States
1968 music festivals